Rachel Elizabeth Haurwitz (born May 20, 1985) is an American biochemist and structural biologist. She is the co-founder, chief executive officer, and president of Caribou Biosciences, a genome editing company.

Early life and education 
Haurwitz was born on May 20, 1985. She grew up in Austin, Texas. Her mother is an elementary school teacher and her father, an environmental journalist.

Haurwitz began researching RNA during her undergraduate years. She attended Harvard College where she earned an undergraduate degree. In 2007, she began doctoral studies at University of California, Berkeley. At the age of 21, Haurwitz began working as a graduate student in Jennifer Doudna's laboratory, in 2008 where she completed her doctorate in molecular and cell biology. Haurwitz originally intended on becoming an intellectual property lawyer for biotechnology patents but later chose to continue in science.

Career 
In 2011, Haurwitz and Doudna co-founded Caribou Biosciences, a gene editing spinout-startup company. Haurwitz is the company's CEO and president. She holds several patents for CRISPR-based technologies. The firm was initially housed in the basement of the building that housed Doudna's laboratory. The company supports the commercialization of CRISPR technology in healthcare and agriculture. Its researchers explore issues in antimicrobial resistance, food scarcity, and vaccine shortages.  The company licensed Berkeley's CRISPR patent and deals with agricultural and pharmaceutical companies and research firms. In 2018, Haurwitz announced that the firm was shifting focus on medicine and developing cancer therapies targeting microbes.

Personal life 
She is a long-distance runner and is training for a marathon. Haurwitz knits as a hobby.

Selected works

Papers

References

External links

University of California, Berkeley alumni
Harvard College alumni
American women biochemists
American women biologists
21st-century American chemists
21st-century American women scientists
Scientists from Texas
People from Austin, Texas
1985 births
Living people
21st-century American biologists
Jewish American scientists
American women chief executives
American women company founders
American company founders
21st-century American businesspeople
Jewish women scientists
Jewish women in business
21st-century American businesswomen
Structural biologists
21st-century American Jews